Cartosat-2D is an Earth observation satellite in a Sun-synchronous orbit (SSO) and the fifth of the Cartosat series of satellites. The satellite is built, launched and maintained by the Indian Space Research Organisation (ISRO). Cartosat-2D has a mass of 714 kg.

Satellite description 
The satellite achieves three-axis stabilization through a combination of reaction wheels, magnetorquers and hydrazine-fuelled reaction control thrusters. Power is generated by a pair of solar panels, charging two lithium-ion batteries. The solar panels generate 986 watts of power when in Sun-pointed mode. The satellite is outfitted with an eight-channel GPS receiver for the calculation of instantaneous state vectors and orbital parameters. GPS is also used for GEO-referencing of acquired imaging data.

Instruments 
The CartoSat-2D carries a panchromatic camera (PAN) capable of taking black-and-white pictures in the visible region of electromagnetic spectrum. It also carries a High-Resolution Multi-Spectral (HRMX) radiometer which is a type of optical imager. The satellite has a spatial resolution of 0.6 metres. CartoSat-2D is also capable of capturing minute long video of a fixed spot as well, Event Monitoring camera (EvM) for frequent high-resolution land observation of selected areas.

Launch 
It was launched by the Polar Satellite Launch Vehicle (PSLV), PSLV-C37, on 15 February 2017, at 03:58 UTC along with two Indian nanosatellites (INS-1A and INS-1B) and 101 nanosatellites belonging to research facilities in the United States, Kazakhstan, Israel, the Netherlands, Switzerland, and the United Arab Emirates.

See also 
 List of Indian satellites

References 

Cartosat
Spacecraft launched by India in 2017
Spacecraft launched by PSLV rockets